The year 2005 in archaeology involved some significant events.

Excavations
 May–September - Dutch East India Company ship Rooswijk (1740) on the Goodwin Sands.
 July - Renewed excavation at Street House Anglo-Saxon cemetery in north east England.
 Workers' barrack at site of Mount Lowe Railway in California.

Exploration
 Survey of the site of the naval Battle of the Aegates begins.

Publications
 Mark P. Leone - The Archaeology of Liberty in an American Capital: Excavations in Annapolis.
 Adrienne Mayor - Fossil Legends of the First Americans.
 Reynolds, A. C., Betancourt, J. L., Quade, J., Patchett, P. J., Dean, J. S., and Stein, J. "87Sr/86Sr sourcing of ponderosa pine used in Anasazi Great House construction at Chaco Canyon, New Mexico." Journal of Archaeological Science 32 pp. 1061–1075.

Finds
 February - Newark Torc discovered in England.
 March - Discovery of KV63, the first tomb in the Valley of the Kings found since 1922.
 May - Statue of Nike at Tadmor.
 June - Archaeologists excavating the Templo Mayor site in Tenochtitlan (modern-day Mexico City) discover a rare child sacrifice to the Aztec war god Huitzilopochtli. The child's body was given a ceremonial burial in a seated position, probably around 1450 in a cornerstone-laying ceremony to mark the building a new portion of the temple (announced July 22).
 August - Large Stone Structure, remains of a large 10th to 9th century BCE public building in East Jerusalem, believed by the excavator to be perhaps remains of the Palace of David.
 Megiddo church, remains of a 3rd-century Christian church, the earliest found in the country, near Tel Megiddo in northern Israel.
 A bone figurine of a bird 2 cm long is found at Lingjing in Henan province of China; it is subsequently dated at 13,500 BCE, making it 8,500 years older than any other known sculpture from east Asia.
 A gold wreath from Thrace is found in Bulgaria.

Events
 April 18 - The bodies of thirty British Royal Navy officers and sailors discovered in 2000 on Nelson's Island are buried in a naval ceremony in Alexandria, Egypt. Dating from the Battle of the Nile (1798) and another battle three years later, only one body, that of Commander James Russell, can be positively identified.
April 20 - The first part of the Obelisk of Axum returned to Ethiopia. It was taken to Rome in 1937 on Mussolini's orders.

Deaths
 July 15 - Anders Hagen, Norwegian archaeologist (b. 1921)
 November 21 - Aileen Fox, English archaeologist (b. 1907).

See also
 List of years in archaeology
 Abydos - site of table of Egyptian pharaoh names.
 Pompeii
 Mayapan

References

Archaeology by year
Archaeology